Bexhövede is a village in the Cuxhaven district of Lower Saxony, Germany which was incorporated into the municipality of Loxstedt in 1974.  It is well known for being the origin of the noble Buxhoeveden family.

Name
The name "Bexhövede" comes from the Old Saxon "Buxhoevede" and means "origin of the brook" or "water source."  The bek, or stream from which Bexhövede gets its name is portrayed as a wavy bar on the chief of the town's coat of arms.  The lower half of the escutcheon is derived from the arms of the Buxhoeveden family.

Notable residents
 Albert of Riga (c.1165–1229), Founder of Riga, builder of city's cathedral, third Bishop of Riga in Livonia.  Founder of the Livonian Brothers of the Sword
 Hermann of Dorpat (1163–1248) First Prince-Bishop of the Bishopric of Dorpat within the Livonian Confederation

See also
Buxhoeveden family

References

External links 
Community Information – in German

Cuxhaven (district)
Former municipalities in Lower Saxony